Edward Wheelock Tullidge (September 30, 1829 – May 21, 1894) was a literary critic, newspaper editor, playwright, and historian of the Utah Territory.  During his life he was a member and leader in several different denominations of the Latter Day Saint Movement, including the Church of Jesus Christ of Latter-day Saints (LDS Church), the New Movement (Godbeite) movement, and the Reorganized Church of Jesus Christ of Latter Day Saints (RLDS Church). He played a significant role in the creation of the Salt Lake Tribune.

Towards his death, Tullidge was respected even within the LDS Church community for his fair portrayals in his histories.  He was a strong advocate for women's suffrage. Historian Claudia Bushman wrote that Tullidge "stood alone as a Mormon feminist historian before the revitalization of the women's movement in the 1970s."

Biography

Early life in England
Tullidge was born at Weymouth, Dorset, England as Edward William Tullidge.  He was born into a middle class Methodist home, and apprenticed as a coach builder and painter.  His father was John E. Tullidge, who became a noted early musician in the state of Utah.

At the age of 17 he became a member of the Church of Jesus Christ of Latter-day Saints  He spent twelve years doing missionary work for his church in Great Britain, mending shoes for money, and writing articles for the Millennial Star. Among those who he would walk to church with at this time was the later Latter-day Saint poet Emily Hill Woodmansee.  In 1852, Tullidge briefly renounced his beliefs in Mormonism and joined a deist society, even requesting his name be removed from Church records, but soon returned to Mormonism.

In 1856, the President of the mission, Franklin D. Richards, took note of Tullidge's articles and called him from proselytizing to work in the Liverpool editorial office of the Millennial Star under the incoming president, Orson Pratt. While in Liverpool, he felt a calling to move to Utah and write a biography of Joseph Smith.

Emigration to Utah
Tullidge emigrated to Utah Territory in 1861. He approached Brigham Young enthusiastically with ideas for improving the literary quality of Utah but was disappointingly met with little encouragement or response. He approached Wilford Woodruff and George A. Smith and received permission to use their journals for his planned biography of Smith.  Tullidge had been impressed with a story he heard from Orson Hyde, telling of heavenly voices accompanying the appointment of Brigham Young to the first presidency of the LDS Church.  He was troubled by the lack of evidence in the journals for this event and after discussion with Woodruff, became convinced this claim was false.

On November 15, 1862, he was called as a president of the sixty-fifth Quorum of the Seventy.

In October 1864, he began publishing a literary magazine with his friend Elias L. T. Harrison called Peep O'Day, the first to be published west of the Missouri.  A purpose of the magazine was to push the church away from perceived theocracy, and create a new culture led by the example of Mormonism. Editorials by Tulidge were criticized by Brigham Young, increasing Tullidge's disgruntlement with what he felt was Young's autocratic style.  In a time when animosity between Mormons and non-Mormons was increasing, the magazine advocating for unity was not popular and did not last for a full year, running through just five issues.

The failure of his magazine and pressure to produce sent him into a depression and heavy drinking, that in the words of Tullidge, "nearly sent me to the grave". He was living with Wilford Woodruff at the time, and received several healing blessings from Woodruff.  Upon what he felt was a miraculous recovery from an illness in 1866, he went east, and wrote for a New York Magazine called the Galaxy for the next two years.  His articles were frequently about Mormonism, portraying them in a positive light and attempting to bridge the cultural divide between Mormons and the rest of the United States.  Orson Pratt visited him on his way back from his English mission.  In 1867, Tullidge embarked on a four month mission to several eastern cities.

On his 1868 journey back to the territory of Utah, he stopped on the way to visit Emma Smith, the widow of Joseph Smith.  He came away convinced she was in error, but also sympathetic, promising himself that he would never write about her disrespectfully.

Godbeite movement

Upon returning to the Utah territory, he became friends with the future leaders of the Godbeite movement, including William S. Godbe.  Tullidge and Elias Harrison were patronized by Godbe, and started a new magazine called the Utah Magazine. When Harrison and Godbe went to New York for a rest, Tullidge continued on alone with the magazine. While in New York, Godbe and Harrison said they received audible revelations convincing them that the LDS Church had gone astray under Brigham Young, neglected spiritual duties and focused too much on worldly kingdom building.  When Godbe and Harrison returned to Utah, they formed a revolt against some of the secular policies of Young.

Tullidge for his part had been somewhat supportive of Young's economic policies, and had developed a friendly relationship with Young, but joined his friends in the revolt and wrote a history of world figures that differed from Mormonism's historical view. When the seven of the writers of the Utah Magazine were arraigned for a church disciplinary action, Young personally intervened and dismissed the charges against only Tullidge.  At the trial of Godbe and Harrison, Tullidge plead with them to reconcile rather than be excommunicated, stating "My own heart never yearned so much towards Brigham as on the trial in question," and that Young was "the great man who has so long been to us in the position of a father."

Godbe and Harrison did not reconcile, and were excommunicated for apostasy.  Tullidge resigned his membership in solidarity in an open letter to Brigham Young, writing "For years I have tried to shun the issues of this day ... for theoretically I have been a believer in republican institutions and not in a temporal theocracy."  The Utah Magazine changed into a newspaper, called The Mormon Tribune, and eventually renamed The Salt Lake Tribune.  Tullidge became an influential proponent of the New Movement, particularly in the eastern United States press.  The Godbeite's formed a new church, called the "Church of Zion", and within this church Tullidge was appointed as a President of the First Council of the Seventy and a member of the Salt Lake Stake Presidency.  During these years Tullidge wrote disparagingly of Young, to the point that years later he wrote Young an apology for his words.

Tullidge participated outwardly in religious organizations but at this time had "an unbelief of eight years", that he had a "philosophical state of religion" and did not accept "the mission of any special prophet."

By the early 1870s, Tullidge's began to participate less in the New Movement. Godbe and Harrison increasingly began to embrace Spiritualism, which Tullidge did not agree with, publicly accusing Godbe and Harrison of betraying the original principles of the movement. Tullidge turned his focus on other projects, including a play on the life of Oliver Cromwell, and went East to promote it.  In 1871 he returned to Utah and became an associate editor of what was now the Salt Lake Tribune.  Tullidge still hoped the Godbeites and Brighamites factions could be reconciled, but as the Tribune became more oppositional, Tullidge lost his editorship in 1873.

Tullidge began to write a series of biographies, his first one on Brigham Young.  Although Tullidge self identified as an apostate, he reconciled with his earlier Church.  Young wrote that Tullidge "had suffered enough" and gave him access to historical materials.  His book "Life of Brigham Young: or, Utah and Her Founders" was published in 1876.  This was followed by "Women of Mormondom" in 1877, which included biographies of prominent Mormon women, and advocated for women's suffrage.

Reorganized Church of Jesus Christ of Latter Day Saints
In 1878 Tullidge published "The Life of Joseph the Prophet". Young had died in 1877, and the new leader of the LDS Church John Taylor was not as sympathetic towards Tullidge.  The book gave credit to Joseph F. Smith and Eliza R. Snow for their help reading and revising the manuscript, and Taylor thought it was an opportunistic subterfuge to imply LDS Church sanction of the book. Taylor issued a statement discouraging members from buying the book.

Joseph Smith III, the leader of Reorganized Church of Jesus Christ of Latter Day Saints (RLDS Church) and son of Joseph Smith, wrote to Tullidge expressing his approval of the biography. Tullidge traveled to Missouri and in late 1879 became a member of the RLDS Church.  He was ordained an elder, acted as a clerk at general conference, preached in congregations and became the RLDS Historian.  He revised his biography of Joseph Smith, adding sections denying polygamy, inferences that Brigham Young was not the rightful successor to Smith, and other expansions on RLDS Church history.  The biography was published by the RLDS Church and became its history up to that time.

During this time, Tullidge wrote a letter to the President of the United States, Rutherford B. Hayes asking him to appoint Joseph Smith III as governor of Utah, a move that he said would destroy, "Polygamic Theocracy."

Return to Utah
The RLDS Church called Tullidge on a mission to Utah in October 1879. Perhaps surprisingly to him, Tullidge was welcomed back by the population of Utah, and his devotion to the RLDS Church fizzled.  He was commissioned by leading members of the LDS Church to write an important "History of Salt Lake City", published a new magazine "Tullidge's Quarterly Magazine", and in 1889 a history of the intermountain west.  It was a difficult time in the state of Utah, and several of these ventures were not financially successful.  With a house facing foreclosure, and a possible bankruptcy, he wrote several letters to Wilford Woodruff, begging for assistance.  The LDS Church responded by buying fifty copies of his Salt Lake City history, and fifty more copies of his intermountain west history.  There is evidence that other assistance was also provided.

Tullidge's alcoholism increased and at the age of 65, on May 22, 1894 he died.

Marriage and family
Tullidge had two polygamous marriages that both ended in divorce.  The first was to his cousin Jane Bowring, who Tullidge said he married out of "love of family and Mormons." His second marriage was to Eliza Kingsford Bowring, ten years older than him, the widow of his cousin and friend of his mother, possibly to provide her a home. His final marriage to Susannah Ferguson produced ten children, five of whom survived infancy.

Ferguson became poverty stricken after the death of Tullidge, and eight years after his death, she committed suicide, her body found in a tent with frayed blankets and little to protect her from the cold ground.

See also
 Phrenology and the Latter Day Saint Movement

Publications

Books

  Simultaneously self-published by Tullidge as The History of Salt Lake City and Its Founders.

Periodicals

Articles

Plays

  (1887 edition by Star Printing Company)

Notes

References
.
.  (Continues on p. 52 of the November and December Herald issues.)
.
.
.

External links 
 
 

1829 births
1894 deaths
19th-century American dramatists and playwrights
19th-century male writers
American Latter Day Saints
British Latter Day Saints
Converts to Mormonism
Editors of Latter Day Saint publications
English Latter Day Saint writers
English Latter Day Saints
English dramatists and playwrights
English emigrants to the United States
English male dramatists and playwrights
English members of the Community of Christ
Godbeites
Historians of Utah
Historians of the Latter Day Saint movement
Mormon feminists
Mormon pioneers
People excommunicated by the Church of Jesus Christ of Latter-day Saints
People from Weymouth, Dorset
Religious leaders from Utah
Writers from Utah